Indian Creek is a stream in Pike County of northeastern Missouri. It is a tributary of North Fork Cuivre River.

Indian Creek was so named for the fact mound-building Indians once settled the area.

See also
List of rivers of Missouri

References

Rivers of Pike County, Missouri
Rivers of Missouri